Kopsia larutensis is a species of plant in the family Apocynaceae. It is found in Peninsular Malaysia, Borneo and Thailand.

References

larutensis
Data deficient plants
Flora of Peninsular Malaysia
Flora of Sarawak
Flora of Thailand
Plants described in 1908
Taxonomy articles created by Polbot